In the mathematical disciplines of algebraic topology and homotopy theory, Eckmann–Hilton duality in its most basic form, consists of taking a given diagram for a particular concept and reversing the direction of all arrows, much as in category theory with the idea of the opposite category. A significantly deeper form argues that the fact that the dual notion of a limit is a colimit allows us to change the Eilenberg–Steenrod axioms for homology to give axioms for cohomology. It is named after Beno Eckmann and Peter Hilton.

Discussion 
This then leads to the adjoint relation , which allows the study of spectra, which give rise to cohomology theories.

We can also directly relate fibrations and cofibrations: a fibration  is defined by having the homotopy lifting property, represented by the following diagram

and a cofibration  is defined by having the dual homotopy extension property, represented by dualising the previous diagram:

The above considerations also apply when looking at the sequences associated to a fibration or a cofibration, as given a fibration  we get the sequence

and  given a cofibration  we get the sequence

and more generally, the duality between the exact and coexact Puppe sequences.

This also allows us to relate homotopy and cohomology: we know that homotopy groups are homotopy classes of maps from the n-sphere to our space, written , and we know that the sphere has a single nonzero (reduced) cohomology group. On the other hand, cohomology groups are homotopy classes of maps to spaces with a single nonzero homotopy group. This is given by the Eilenberg–MacLane spaces  and the relation 

A formalization of the above informal relationships is given by Fuks duality.

See also 
 Model category

References 

Duality theories
Algebraic topology